Chisola is a torrent in Piedmont, north-western Italy.

Geography 
Chisola source is at c. 1,250 m, at the merge of two separante torrent-like branches coming from Monte Tre Denti (1,445 m) and Monte Brunello/Monte Freidour (1,343 m).

The torrent flows entirely in the territory of the Metropolitan City of Turin. After receiving the waters of several torrents and rivers such as the Lemina, Noce and Rio Torto, it flows in the Po River in the Padan Plain, in the territory of Moncalieri, south-west to Turin.

References 

Rivers of Italy
Rivers of the Province of Turin
Rivers of the Alps